is one of the private junior Colleges located at Chūō-ku, Niigata in Japan. It was established in 1987, and is now attached to The Nippon Dental University.

Department and Graduate Course

Departments 
 Department of dental hygiene

Advanced course 
 Major of dental hygienist

See also 
 List of junior colleges in Japan
 The Nippon Dental University
 The Nippon Dental University College at Tokyo

External links
 The Nippon Dental University College at Niigata

Private universities and colleges in Japan
Japanese junior colleges
Universities and colleges in Niigata Prefecture
Educational institutions established in 1987
1987 establishments in Japan
Niigata (city)
Dental schools in Japan